Valeriu Catană (born 18 March 1962) is a Moldavian professional football manager and former footballer. Since January 2014 he is the head coach of Moldavian football club FC Academia Chişinău.

References

External links
 
 Valeriu Catană at soccerway (as manager)

1962 births
Living people
Footballers from Chișinău
Moldovan footballers
Moldova international footballers
Soviet footballers
Association football defenders
FC Zimbru Chișinău players
FC Bulat Cherepovets players
FC Dynamo Vologda players
FC Tighina players
Gagauziya-Oguzsport players
ULIM Chișinău players
FC Agro-Goliador Chișinău players
Soviet First League players
Soviet Second League players
Soviet Second League B players
Moldovan Super Liga players
Moldovan football managers
FC Agro-Goliador Chișinău managers
FC Politehnica Chișinău managers
Moldovan Super Liga managers
FC Academia Chișinău managers